Gobelins, l'école de l'image is a school of visual communication and arts in Paris, France, with its main location near the Latin Quarter. A consular school funded by the Parisian Chamber of Commerce and Industry, it provides several programs at a range of fees.

It is best known for the Cinéma Department of Animation, founded in 1975 by Pierre Ayma, who brought the school into the spotlight. It has an international reputation, producing numerous talented individuals and teams hired by the world's leading animation studios, including Disney, Universal, Hanna Barbera, Pixar, DreamWorks and Warner Bros. Its former students include many strip cartoonists and animation artists such as Didier Cassegrain, Cromwell, Jean-François Miniac, and Pierre Coffin. The faculty includes world-class industry leaders such as Michel Bouvet.

Over the years, Gobelins has introduced major innovations in multimedia content, developing products for the web, CD-ROM, Interactive DVD, and public installations. The video department, created by Daniel Boullay and Guy Chevalier for the training of adult students, has since 1985 been prominent in the French technical audiovisual landscape. Led by Daniel Desmoulins, the video department allows professionals to create or analyze techniques, keeping current with the rapid evolution of industry technologies. Gobelins also offers instruction in photography and graphic design.

Notable alumni
Pierre Coffin, director of Despicable Me.
Bibo Bergeron, director of A Monster in Paris, The Road to El Dorado and Shark Tale.
Kristof Serrand, supervising animator at DreamWorks Animation. 
Marion Montaigne, known particularly for Tu mourras moins bête....
Bastien Vivès, co-creator of Lastman (comic book).
Olivier Grunewald,  photographer.
Riad Sattouf, creator of The Arab of the Future. 
Yves Bigerel, co-creator of Lastman (comic book).
Olivier Cotte, animation historian.
Rikke Asbjoern, co-creator of Pinky Malinky.
Violaine Briat, storyboard artist on The Loud House.
Bertrand Mandico, film director
Lucrèce Andreae, film director
Simon Otto, head of character animation at DreamWorks Animation.
Thomas Romain, co-creator of Code Lyoko and co-producer of Oban Star-Racers.

Notable student films

 Le Building (2005) - by Marco Nguyen, Pierre Perifel, Xavier Ramonède, Olivier Staphylas, and Rémi Zaarour
 Oktapodi (2007) - by Julien Bocabeille, François-Xavier Chanioux, Olivier Delabarre, Thierry Marchand, Quentin Marmier, and Emud Mokhberi
 Last Summer (2022) - by Nicola Bernardi, Alessandra De Stefano, Chloé Van Becelaere, Camille Van Delft, and Elodie Xia

External links
 www.gobelins.fr, The Official School Site
 www.gobelins-school.com, The Official School Site (English version)
 Les meilleures films des étudiants (Vidéos)
 Students and alumni of Les Gobelins

Coordinates
 : Paris site
 : Noisy-le-Grand site

References 

Education in Paris
Art schools in Paris
Art schools in France
French animation studios
Educational institutions established in 1975

Animation schools in France